Enigma: Intermission 2 (stylized as Enigma: Intermission II) is a compilation album by power metal band Stratovarius, released on 28 September 2018 worldwide. The album has a collection of rare Stratovarius tracks from their four most recent studio albums: Polaris, Elysium, Nemesis and Eternal. It also includes three new tracks: Enigma, Burn Me Down and Oblivion, along with four orchestral versions of previous Stratovarius songs. The album is a follow-up to 2001's Intermission.

Two songs from the album were released as singles before its release: Oblivion on 10 August and Unbreakable (Orchestral Version) on 14 September 2018.

Track listing

Personnel
Timo Kotipelto – vocals
Matias Kupiainen – guitar, production
Jens Johansson – keyboard
Rolf Pilve – drums
Lauri Porra – bass
Jörg Michael – drums on 3, 5, 8 and 11

References

Stratovarius compilation albums
Edel Music albums
2018 compilation albums